Arnaldo Andrés Giménez Dos Santos (born 9 March 1987, in Luque, Paraguay) is an Paraguayan naturalized Bolivian footballer who plays as a goalkeeper for Bolivian club Wilstermann.

Honours
Olimpia
 Torneo Clausura Paraguayan Primera División Championship: 2011

Wilstermann
 Torneo Apertura Bolivian Primera División: 2018
 Torneo Clausura Bolivian Primera División: 2019

References
 
 

1987 births
Living people
Paraguayan footballers
Association football goalkeepers
Club Atlético 3 de Febrero players
Club Olimpia footballers
Silvio Pettirossi footballers
Sportivo Trinidense footballers
Unión La Calera footballers
Boca Unidos footballers
C.D. Jorge Wilstermann players
Chilean Primera División players
Paraguayan expatriate footballers
Paraguayan expatriate sportspeople in Chile
Expatriate footballers in Chile
Paraguayan expatriate sportspeople in Argentina
Expatriate footballers in Argentina
Paraguayan expatriate sportspeople in Colombia
Expatriate footballers in Colombia
Paraguayan expatriate sportspeople in Bolivia
Expatriate footballers in Bolivia